Munemori (written: 宗盛 or 宗森) is both a Japanese surname and a masculine Japanese surname. Notable people with the name include:

, United States Army soldier
, Japanese samurai

Japanese-language surnames
Japanese masculine given names